Haruhiko Kindaichi (金田一 春彦, Kindaichi Haruhiko; April 3, 1913 – May 19, 2004) was a Japanese linguist and a scholar of Japanese linguistics (known as kokugogaku). He was well known as an editor of Japanese dictionaries and his research in Japanese dialects. He was awarded the Order of the Rising Sun for his efforts. He was awarded a Doctor of Literature degree at Tokyo University in 1962. He was given official commendation as someone who has performed special service in the field of culture and an honorary citizen of the Tokyo Metropolitan District.

Early life
He was born on April 3, 1913, at his mother's home in Morikawa-cho, Hongo Ward, Tokyo City (now Hongo 6-chome, Bunkyō Ward, Tokyo Metropolitan District), as the eldest and only son of Shizue (née Hayashi) and noted linguist and expert on the Ainu language Kyōsuke Kindaichi. The son resembled the father in his enthusiasm for learning and his mother in her secularism. When their son was born, his father had lost his job as a proofreader of the Sanseidō encyclopaedia, so his family was in dire economic straits. His father eventually worked as a professor at Tokyo Imperial University.

Work
Haruhiko became known to the broader public with the publication of his book Nihongo (The Japanese Language) in 1957, which became a bestseller for its anecdotal approach to the nature of the language. He went on, like Susumu Ōno, to become a familiar public intellectual, appearing often on radio and television to discuss linguistic issues.

Awards
 Medals of Honor (Japan) (1977)
 Order of the Rising Sun, 3rd class (1986)
 Person of Cultural Merit (1997)
 Order of the Sacred Treasure, 2nd class (2004)

References

Linguists from Japan
1913 births
2004 deaths
Recipients of the Medal with Purple Ribbon
Recipients of the Order of the Rising Sun, 3rd class
Recipients of the Order of the Sacred Treasure, 2nd class
Academic staff of Sophia University
Academic staff of Nagoya University
Academic staff of the University of Tokyo
University of Tokyo alumni
Japanese lexicographers
People from Bunkyō
20th-century linguists
Linguists of Japanese
20th-century lexicographers